Yuan Zhi (born  in Shenyang, Liaoning) is a Chinese male volleyball player. He is part of the China men's national volleyball team and won the silver medal at the 2006 Asian Games. 
He competed for Team China at the 2008 Summer Olympics in Beijing. On club level he plays for Liaoning.

References

External links
 profile at FIVB.org
Profile at 2008teamchina.olympic.cn

1981 births
Living people
Olympic volleyball players of China
Volleyball players at the 2008 Summer Olympics
Volleyball players from Shenyang
Asian Games medalists in volleyball
Volleyball players at the 2002 Asian Games
Volleyball players at the 2006 Asian Games
Volleyball players at the 2010 Asian Games
Volleyball players at the 2014 Asian Games
Chinese men's volleyball players
Medalists at the 2006 Asian Games
Asian Games silver medalists for China
21st-century Chinese people